Arosio is a village and former municipality in the canton of Ticino, Switzerland.

In 2005 the municipality was merged with the other, neighboring municipalities Breno, Fescoggia, Mugena and Vezio to form a new and larger municipality Alto Malcantone.

History
Arosio is first mentioned in 1335 as Aroxio.

According to tradition, the Roman road leading from Ponte Tresa to Monte Ceneri Pass ran through Arosio.  By the Middle Ages it was a central town in the upper Magliasina valley, which was at that time was known as the Valle d'Arosio.  The villages of Arosio, Breno, Cademario, Mugena Tortoglio and Vezio formed an economic and political unit.

The Church of San Michele is first mentioned in 1217.  In 1640-47 it was totally rebuilt.  It contains a cycle of frescoes by Antonio da Tradate and notable stucco work by local artists from the 17th and 18th Centuries.  At one time, the architects and master builders of Arosio operated throughout Europe.

The local economy was based on agriculture and herding in the alpine meadows.  In recent decades the services sector dominated the local economy.  After 1960, a number of new houses were built in the village.

Location

The village consisted of the amalgamated settlements Terra di sopra and Terra di sotto.

Historic population
The historical population is given in the following table:

Notes

References

Former municipalities of Ticino
Villages in Ticino